Lists of Malayalam films cover films produced by the Malayalam cinema industry in the Malayalam language. The first Malayalam silent movie, Vigathakumaran, directed by J. C. Daniel, began shooting in 1928 and was released in 1930. 
The lists are organized by release date.

Lists by release date
List of Malayalam films before 1960
List of Malayalam films of the 1960s
List of Malayalam films of the 1970s
List of Malayalam films of the 1980s
List of Malayalam films of the 1990s
List of Malayalam films of the 2000s
List of Malayalam films of the 2010s
List of Malayalam films of the 2020s

See  also
 List of highest-grossing Malayalam films

References

Malayalam
Malayalam